Mineral Springs is an unincorporated community in Marion County, Tennessee, United States.

Notes

Unincorporated communities in Marion County, Tennessee
Unincorporated communities in Tennessee